Toby Keith Covel (born July 8, 1961), known professionally as Toby Keith,  is an American country music singer, songwriter, actor, and record producer. He released his first four studio albums—1993's Toby Keith, 1994's Boomtown, 1996's Blue Moon and 1997's Dream Walkin', plus a Greatest Hits package—for various divisions of Mercury Records before leaving Mercury in 1998. These albums all earned Gold or higher certification, and produced several Top Ten singles, including his debut "Should've Been a Cowboy", which topped the country charts and was the most-played country song of the 1990s. The song has received three million spins since its release, according to Broadcast Music Incorporated.

Signed to DreamWorks Records Nashville in 1998, Keith released his breakthrough single "How Do You Like Me Now?!" in late 1999. This song, the title track to his 1999 album of the same name, was the number one country song of 2000, and one of several chart-toppers during his tenure on DreamWorks Nashville. His next three albums, Pull My Chain, Unleashed, and Shock'n Y'all, produced three more number ones each, and all of the albums were certified 4× Platinum. A second Greatest Hits package followed in 2004, and after that, he released Honkytonk University.

When DreamWorks closed in 2005, Keith founded the label Show Dog Nashville, which merged with Universal South Records to become Show Dog-Universal Music in December 2009. He has released ten studio albums through Show Dog/Show Dog-Universal: 2006's White Trash with Money, 2007's Big Dog Daddy, 2008's That Don't Make Me a Bad Guy, 2009's American Ride, 2010's Bullets in the Gun, 2011's Clancy's Tavern, 2012's Hope on the Rocks, 2013's Drinks After Work, 2015's 35 MPH Town, 2017's The Bus Songs, and 2021's Peso in My Pocket, as well as the compilation 35 Biggest Hits in 2008. Keith also made his acting debut in 2006, starring in the film Broken Bridges, and co-starred with comedian Rodney Carrington in the 2008 film Beer for My Horses, inspired by his song of the same name.

Keith has released 19 studio albums, 2 Christmas albums, and 5 compilation albums, totaling worldwide sales of over 40 million albums. He has charted 61 singles on the Billboard Hot Country Songs charts, including 20 number one hits and 22 additional top 10 hits. His longest-lasting number one hits are "Beer for My Horses" (a 2003 duet with Willie Nelson) and "As Good as I Once Was" (2005), at six weeks each. Keith was awarded the National Medal of Arts by President Donald Trump in a closed ceremony alongside Ricky Skaggs on January 13, 2021.

Early life
Keith was born in Clinton, Oklahoma, to Carolyn Joan (née Ross) and Hubert K. Covel, Jr. He has a sister and a brother. The family lived in Fort Smith, Arkansas, for a few years when Keith was in grade school, but moved to Moore, Oklahoma (a suburb of Oklahoma City), when he was still young. Before the family moved to Moore, he visited his grandmother in Fort Smith during the summers. His grandmother owned Billie Garner's Supper Club in Fort Smith, where Keith became interested in the musicians who came there to play. He did odd jobs around the supper club and started getting up on the bandstand to play with the band. He got his first guitar at the age of eight. After the family moved to Moore, Keith attended Highland West Junior High and Moore High School, where he played defensive end on the football team.

Keith graduated from Moore High School and worked as a derrick hand in the oil fields. He worked his way up to become an operation manager. When Keith was 20, he and his friends Scott Webb, Keith Cory, David "Yogi" Vowell and Danny Smith, with a few others, formed the Easy Money Band, which played at local bars as he continued to work in the oil industry. At times, he would have to leave in the middle of a concert if he was paged to work in the oil field.

In 1982, the oil industry in Oklahoma began a rapid decline and Keith soon found himself unemployed. He fell back on his football training and played defensive end with the semi-pro Oklahoma City Drillers while continuing to perform with his band. (The Drillers were an unofficial farm club of the United States Football League's Oklahoma Outlaws; Keith tried out for the Outlaws but did not make the team.) He then returned to focus once again on music. His family and friends were doubtful he would succeed, but, in 1984, Easy Money (various other band members included Mike Barnes, T.A. Brauer, and David Saylors) began playing the honky-tonk circuit in Oklahoma and Texas.

Musical career

In the early 1990s, Keith went to Nashville, Tennessee, where he hung out and busked on Music Row and at a place called Houndogs. He distributed copies of a demo tape the band had made to the many record companies in the city. There was no interest by any of the record labels, and Keith returned home feeling depressed. He had promised himself and God to have a recording contract by the time he was 30 years old or give up on music as a career. A flight attendant and fan of his gave a copy of Keith's demo tape to Harold Shedd, a Mercury Records executive, while he was traveling on a flight she was working. Shedd enjoyed what he heard, went to see Keith perform live and then signed him to a recording contract with Mercury.

1993–1995: Toby Keith and Boomtown
Keith's debut single, "Should've Been a Cowboy", went to number one on the U.S. Billboard Hot Country Songs chart in 1993, and it reached number 93 on the Billboard Hot 100. This song led off his self-titled debut album. By the end of the decade, "Should've Been a Cowboy" received more than three million spins at radio, thus making it the most-played country song of the 1990s. Certified platinum by the Recording Industry Association of America (RIAA) for shipments of one million copies, the album produced three more Top 5 hits on the country charts with "He Ain't Worth Missing" (at #5), "A Little Less Talk and a Lot More Action" (originally the B-side of "Should've Been a Cowboy") and "Wish I Didn't Know Now" (both at #2). Stephen Thomas Erlewine of Allmusic wrote of the album, "It is given a production that's a bit too big, clean, glossy and cavernous for Keith's good—it fits the outsized sound of early-'90s radio, but not his outsized talent—but beneath that sheen the songs are very strong." He also thought that it showed the signs of the style that Keith would develop on subsequent albums. The album's success led to Keith touring with then-labelmates Shania Twain and John Brannen. Keith and Twain also appeared in Tracy Lawrence's music video for "My Second Home" in 1993.

Keith then signed with Polydor Records Nashville and released his second album, Boomtown, in September 1994. Also certified platinum, this album was led off by the number one single "Who's That Man". After it, "Upstairs Downtown" and "You Ain't Much Fun" both made the Top 10, while "Big Ol' Truck" peaked at number 15. By late-1995, he released his first Christmas album, Christmas to Christmas, via Mercury. Composed entirely of original songs, the album produced one chart entry in "Santa I'm Right Here", which reached as high as number 50 based on Christmas airplay.

1996–1998: Blue Moon, Dream Walkin and Greatest Hits Volume One
Keith then signed with the short-lived Nashville division of A&M Records to release his third album Blue Moon in April 1996. That album received a platinum certification and produced three singles. Its first single, "Does That Blue Moon Ever Shine on You", which Keith wrote in 1987, peaked at number 2. Following it were "A Woman's Touch" at number 6, and "Me Too", which became his third number one hit in March 1997. Keith also appeared on The Beach Boys' now out-of-print 1996 album Stars and Stripes Vol. 1 performing a cover of their 1963 hit "Be True to Your School" with the Beach Boys themselves providing the harmonies and backing vocals.

Following a corporate merger, Keith returned to Mercury in 1997. His fourth studio album, Dream Walkin', was also his first produced by James Stroud, who would also serve as Keith's co-producer until 2005. It produced two consecutive number 2 hits with "We Were in Love" and a cover of Sting's 1996 single "I'm So Happy I Can't Stop Crying". Sting also sang duet vocals and played bass guitar on it, and the two also performed the song at the 1997 Country Music Association awards. After this song, the album's title track reached number 5, while "Double Wide Paradise" peaked at number 40.

Keith's last Mercury release was Greatest Hits Volume One in October 1998. The album included twelve of his prior singles and two new songs: the country rap "Getcha Some" and "If a Man Answers". Both were released as singles, with "Getcha Some" reaching the Top 20, but "If a Man Answers" became his first single to miss the Top 40. According to Keith, these two songs were originally to be put on a studio album, but Mercury executives, dissatisfied with the album that Keith had made, chose to put those two songs on a greatest hits package, and asked him to "go work on another album". After he recorded two more songs which the label also rejected, he asked to terminate his contract with the label. After exiting Mercury, Keith co-wrote Shane Minor's debut single "Slave to the Habit" with Chuck Cannon and Kostas.

1999–2002: How Do You Like Me Now?! and Pull My Chain
In 1999, Keith moved to DreamWorks Records' Nashville division, of which Stroud served as president. His first release for the label was "When Love Fades", which also failed to make Top 40. Upon seeing the single's poor performance, Keith requested that it be withdrawn and replaced with "How Do You Like Me Now?!", a song that he wrote with Chuck Cannon, and which had previously been turned down by Mercury. It also served as the title track to his first DreamWorks album, How Do You Like Me Now?! The song spent five weeks at number 1 on the country charts, and became his first top 40 pop hit, with a number 31 peak on the Hot 100. It was also the top country song of 2000 according to the Billboard Year-End chart. The album, which was certified platinum, produced a Top 5 hit in "Country Comes to Town" and another number 1 in "You Shouldn't Kiss Me Like This". It was also his first album to feature songs co-written by Scotty Emerick, who would be a frequent collaborator of Keith's for the next several albums. Steve Huey wrote that this album "had a rough, brash attitude that helped give Keith a stronger identity as a performer." In 2001, Keith won the Academy of Country Music's Top Male Vocalist and Album of the Year awards.

Following this album was Pull My Chain, released in August 2001. The album's three singles—"I'm Just Talkin' About Tonight", "I Wanna Talk About Me", and "My List"—all went to number 1 on the country charts, with the latter two both holding that position for five weeks. "I Wanna Talk About Me", written by Bobby Braddock, also displayed a country rap influence with its spoken-word lyrics. The Country Music Association named "My List" as Single of the Year in 2002. Of Pull My Chain, Erlewine wrote that "this is a bigger, better record than its predecessor, possessing a richer musicality and a more confident sense of humor".

2002–2004: Unleashed and Shock'n Y'all
In 2002, he released the Unleashed album which included four singles. First was "Courtesy of the Red, White, & Blue (The Angry American)", which Keith wrote in 20 minutes as a response to the September 11, 2001 attacks. The song references Keith's father, a United States Army veteran who died that March in a car accident. Both this song and "Who's Your Daddy?" were number 1 hits, with "Rock You Baby" reaching number 13. The last single was "Beer for My Horses", a duet with Willie Nelson which spent six weeks at the top of the country charts. At the time, it was also Keith's highest entry on the Hot 100, at number 22. In July 2003, Keith made a guest appearance on Scotty Emerick's debut single "I Can't Take You Anywhere", which was previously recorded by Keith on Pull My Chain. Emerick's version of the song was his only top 40 country hit, at number 27.

Shock'n Y'all, his eighth studio album, was released in November 2003. The album's title is a pun on the military term "shock and awe". It became his second album from which all singles went to number 1: "I Love This Bar", "American Soldier", and "Whiskey Girl". Also included on the disc were "The Taliban Song" and "Weed with Willie", two live songs recorded with Emerick. The album was followed in late 2004 by Greatest Hits 2, which included three new songs: "Stays in Mexico", "Go with Her", and a cover of Inez and Charlie Foxx's "Mockingbird", recorded as a duet with his daughter, Krystal Keith. "Stays in Mexico" was a number 3 hit on the country charts, while "Mockingbird" peaked at number 27.

Keith's final DreamWorks album was Honkytonk University in early 2005. Lead-off single "Honkytonk U" peaked at number 8, followed by "As Good as I Once Was", which spent six weeks at number 1, and "Big Blue Note" at number 5. After the release of the latter, DreamWorks Records ceased operations.

2005–present: After DreamWorks
On August 31, 2005, Keith founded a new label, Show Dog Nashville. Its first release was his 2006 album White Trash with Money, followed by the soundtrack to Broken Bridges. He also abandoned Stroud as co-producer in favor of Cannon's wife, Lari White. The album included three singles: "Get Drunk and Be Somebody", "A Little Too Late", and "Crash Here Tonight". Big Dog Daddy followed in 2007, with Keith serving as sole producer. Its singles were "High Maintenance Woman", "Love Me If You Can", and "Get My Drink On". "Love Me If You Can" became Keith's first number 1 hit since "As Good as I Once Was" more than two years prior. A two-disc Christmas album, A Classic Christmas, followed later in 2007. In 2008, Keith completed his Biggest and Baddest Tour. On May 6, 2008, he released 35 Biggest Hits, a two-disc compilation featuring most of his singles to date, as well as the new song "She's a Hottie", which peaked at number 13.

Keith released "She Never Cried in Front of Me", which went to number 1 in 2008. Its corresponding album, That Don't Make Me a Bad Guy, followed on October 28, 2008. It was followed by "God Love Her", also a number 1 hit, and "Lost You Anyway". American Ride, in 2009, produced another number 1 in its title track. It was followed by the Top 10 hit "Cryin' for Me (Wayman's Song)", a tribute to basketball player and jazz bassist Wayman Tisdale, a friend of Keith's who died in May 2009. The album's final single was "Every Dog Has Its Day".

Bullets in the Gun was released on October 5, 2010. This was Keith's first album not to produce a top 10 hit, with "Trailerhood" reaching number 19, followed by the title track and "Somewhere Else" both at number 12. Keith produced the album with session guitarist Kenny Greenberg and recording engineer Mills Logan.

On October 25, 2011, Clancy's Tavern was released. The album included the single "Made in America", written by Keith along with Bobby Pinson and Scott Reeves, which went to number 1. Following it was "Red Solo Cup", which had previously been made into a music video which became popular. Upon release as a single, "Red Solo Cup" became Keith's best-peaking crossover, reaching number 15 on the Hot 100. The album's final single was "Beers Ago" at number 6 in 2012. In December 2011, Keith was named "Artist of the Decade" by the American Country Awards.

Keith's sixteenth album, Hope on the Rocks, was released in late 2012. It produced only two singles, both of which are top 20 hits: "I Like Girls That Drink Beer" reached at number 17 and the title track peaked at number 18.

In mid-2013, he entered the charts with "Drinks After Work", the first single from his seventeenth album, also titled Drinks After Work. The album's second single is "Shut Up and Hold On".

In October 2014, Keith released "Drunk Americans", the lead single from his eighteenth studio album, 35 MPH Town. In April 2015, Keith released "35 MPH Town", the album's title track and second single. In 2015, Keith was also inducted into the Songwriters Hall of Fame.

In September 2017, Keith released the compilation album, The Bus Songs. The album contains twelve songs: two new, five re-recorded, and five previously released songs. The new songs on the album are "Shitty Golfer" and "Wacky Tobaccy". In the U.S. The Bus Songs topped the Billboard Comedy Albums chart for 11 weeks. It also reached number 6 on the Top Country Albums chart and 38 on the Billboard 200 chart.

In 2021, Keith featured on the Brantley Gilbert single "The Worst Country Song of All Time" with Hardy.

Acting career

Television appearances
Keith performed on a series of television advertisements for Telecom USA for that company's discount long-distance telephone service 10-10-220. He also starred in Ford commercials, singing original songs such as "Ford Truck Man" and "Field Trip (Look Again)" while driving Ford trucks.

Keith made an appearance at the first Total Nonstop Action Wrestling (then NWA-TNA) weekly pay-per-view on June 19, 2002, where his playing of "Courtesy of the Red, White and Blue" was interrupted by Jeff Jarrett.  He would later enter the Gauntlet for the Gold main event, suplexing Jarrett and eliminating him from the match. A short video of the suplex is seen in the clip package when he goes onstage. He appeared the next week, on June 26, and helped Scott Hall defeat Jarrett in singles action.

In 2009, Keith participated in the Comedy Central Roast of Larry the Cable Guy, which aired on March 14, 2009.

Keith received the "Colbert Bump" when he appeared on Comedy Central's The Colbert Report. He holds the distinction of being the only musical artist to have received a five star rating from Stephen Colbert on iTunes.  Keith furthered this connection when he appeared in Colbert's 2008 Christmas special as a hunter. Keith also made an appearance as a musical guest on the October 27, 2011 episode of the Colbert Report.

On October 29, 2011, Keith appeared on Fox Channel's Huckabee with former Arkansas Governor Mike Huckabee. He played "Bullets in the Gun" and he joined with Huckabees house band to play a song at the end of the show.

In December 2018, Keith appeared as a guest on Darci Lynne: My Hometown Christmas.

Acting
In the Autumn of 2005, he filmed Broken Bridges, written by Cherie Bennett and Jeff Gottesfeld, and directed by Steven Goldmann. This feature film from Paramount/CMT Films was released on September 8, 2006. In this contemporary story set in small-town Tennessee, Keith plays Bo Price, a washed-up country musician. The movie also stars Kelly Preston, Burt Reynolds, Tess Harper, and Lindsey Haun.

Keith wrote and starred in the 2008 movie Beer for My Horses, which is based on the 2003 hit song of the same name recorded by Keith and Willie Nelson.

He was also set to star in the film Bloodworth, but later dropped out.

Business ventures
In 2005, Keith opened Toby Keith's I Love This Bar & Grill in Oklahoma City, Oklahoma, as well as Syracuse, New York, and Tulsa, Oklahoma, and now also has restaurants in Thackerville, Oklahoma; Auburn Hills, Michigan; Kansas City; Las Vegas; Mesa, Arizona; Peoria, Arizona; St. Louis Park, Minnesota; Foxborough, Massachusetts; Cincinnati, Ohio; Newport News, Virginia; and Denver, Colorado. Keith does not actually own the new restaurants; the new restaurant is the first in a franchise under Scottsdale, Arizona-based Capri Restaurant Group Enterprises LLC, which purchased the master license agreement to build more Toby Keith restaurants nationwide. Capri Restaurant Group is owned by Frank Capri, who opened the restaurant in Mesa in the shopping center known as Mesa Riverview and is planning on opening multiple locations across the country.

In 2009, Capri Restaurant Group announced that it will open another "I Love this Bar & Grill" location in Pittsburgh, Pennsylvania's South Side Works shopping and entertainment district.

In 2009, Keith also established a line of clothing, TK Steelman.

February 2010 marked the opening of the Toby Keith's I Love This Bar & Grill in the Winstar World Casino, exit 1 on Interstate 35 in Oklahoma. Other locations opened in 2010 by the Capri Restaurant Group included those in Great Lakes Crossing in Auburn Hills, Michigan, and in the Shops at West End in St. Louis Park, Minnesota. Both of which closed in 2015.

In 2011, Keith introduced a new drink named “Wild Shot". At first it was only available in Mexico, but now is sold and served in America. It is a featured drink in his restaurant chain, I Love this Bar and Grill.

Keith's music career and his various other business ventures have made him one of the wealthiest celebrities in the United States.  The July 15, 2013, edition of Forbes magazine features Keith on the cover with the caption "Country Music's $500 million man". The article titled "Cowboy Capitalist" by Zack O'Malley Greenburg also contains information regarding Keith's earnings as a musician over the course of his career, such as earning $65 million in the past 12 months, which surpasses the earnings of even more well known musicians such as Jay-Z and Beyoncé and that he hasn't earned less than $48 million a year over the past 5 years. Keith has written at least one #1 country single over the past 20 years and the partnership between his own label, Show Dog-Universal, and Big Machine Records, which Keith also helped found in 2005.

Political beliefs

Since 2002, Keith has made numerous trips to the Middle East to perform for those serving in the U.S. military. “My father was a soldier. He taught his kids to respect veterans,” said Keith. “It's that respect and the thank-you that we have a military that's in place and ready to defend our nation; our freedom.”

In 2004, Keith called himself "a conservative Democrat who is sometimes embarrassed for his party". He endorsed the re-election of President George W. Bush in the 2004 presidential election and performed at a Dallas, Texas, rally on the night before the election. Keith also endorsed Democrat Dan Boren in his successful run in Oklahoma's 2nd congressional district and is good friends with former Democratic New Mexico Governor Bill Richardson.
In a January 2007 interview with Newsday, Keith was asked whether he supported the Iraq War. He responded with "Never did," and said he favors setting a time limit on the campaign. He also said, "I don't apologize for being patriotic... If there is something socially incorrect about being patriotic and supporting your troops, then they can kiss my ass on that, because I'm not going to budge on that at all. And that has nothing to do with politics. Politics is what's killing America."

In April 2008, Keith said that Barack Obama "looks like a great speaker and a great leader. And I think you can learn on your feet in there, so I don't hold people responsible for not having a whole bunch of political background in the House and Senate." His remarks continued, "I think [John] McCain is a great option too." In August 2008, he called Obama "the best Democratic candidate we've had since Bill Clinton".

In October 2008, Keith told CMT that he had left the Democratic Party and has re-registered as an independent. "My party that I've been affiliated with all these years doesn't stand for anything that I stand for anymore," he says. "They've lost any sensibility that they had, and they've allowed all the kooks in. So I'm going independent." He also told CMT that he would likely vote for the Republican ticket, partially because of his admiration for Sarah Palin.

In March 2009, Keith received the Johnny "Mike" Spann Memorial Semper Fidelis Award during a New York ceremony held by the Marine Corps-Law Enforcement Foundation. The trophy is named for the CIA operative (and former Marine Corps captain) who was the first U.S. casualty in the war in Afghanistan. "Spending time with our soldiers around the world is something I've always regarded as a privilege and honor," he said. "I'm certainly happy to accept this award, but I won't forget for a second who's really doing the heavy lifting to keep this country safe. And that's why I'll keep going back and spending time with those good folks every chance I get."

In April 2009, he voiced support for Obama on Afghanistan and other decisions: "He hired one of my best friends who I think should run for president someday...Gen. James Jones as a national security adviser. He's sending troops into Afghanistan, help is on the way there. And I'm seeing some really good middle range stuff. I'm giving our commander in chief a chance before I start grabbing. So far, I'm cool with it."

Courtesy of the Red, White and Blue

On March 24, 2001, Keith's father, H.K. Covel, was killed in a car accident. That event and the September 11 attacks in 2001 prompted Keith to write the song "Courtesy of the Red, White, & Blue", a song about his father's patriotism and faith in the United States, originally intended only for live shows. According to Keith, following a performance for military leadership, Commandant of the Marine Corps James L. Jones told Keith it was his "duty as an American citizen" to record the song. As the lead single from the album Unleashed (2002), "Courtesy of the Red, White, & Blue" peaked at number one on the July 20, 2002 Billboard Hot Country Songs chart.

ABC invited Keith to perform on a 2002 Fourth of July concert it was producing. According to Keith, he was dropped from the show after host Peter Jennings heard the song "Courtesy of the Red, White and Blue" and rejected it. Keith was further quoted as saying "Isn't he Canadian?", and "I bet Dan Rather wouldn't kick me off his show." Dan Rather, in response, stated “And I'm not gonna be a hypocrite, you wouldn't want me to. I like Peter, he's a good guy.” ABC, however, stated that it was the network that did not want to begin the show with an angry song. Jennings later stated that, while the situation was regrettable, opening the show with the song "probably wouldn't set the right tone".

Feud with The Dixie Chicks
Keith had a public feud with the Dixie Chicks over the song "Courtesy of the Red, White, & Blue", in 2002, as well as over comments they made about President George W. Bush on stage during a concert in London, in March 2003. The lead singer of the Dixie Chicks, Natalie Maines, publicly stated that Keith's song was "ignorant, and it makes country music sound ignorant".  Keith responded by displaying a backdrop at his concerts showing a doctored photo of Maines with Iraqi dictator Saddam Hussein. On May 21, 2003, Maines wore a T-shirt with the letters "FUTK" on the front at the Academy of Country Music Awards. While a spokesperson for the Dixie Chicks said that the acronym stood for "Friends United in Truth and Kindness," many, including host Vince Gill, took it to be a shot at Keith ("Fuck You Toby Keith").  In an October 2004 appearance on Real Time with Bill Maher, Maines finally confessed that it was indeed a shot at Keith, and that she "thought that nobody would get it".

In August 2003, Keith's representation publicly declared he was done feuding with Maines "because he's realized there are far more important things to concentrate on".  Keith was referring specifically to the terminal illness of a former bandmate's daughter, Allison Faith Webb. However, he continues to refuse to say Maines' name, and claims that the doctored photo was intended to express his opinion that Maines' criticism was an attempt to squelch Keith's free speech.

In April 2008, a commercial spot to promote Al Gore's "We Campaign", involving both Keith and the Dixie Chicks, was proposed. However, the idea was eventually abandoned due to scheduling conflicts.

Donald Trump 
On January 19, 2017, Toby Keith performed at the pre-Inaugural "Make America Great Again! Welcome Celebration" held at the Lincoln Memorial in Washington, D.C. in celebration of the beginning of the presidency of Donald Trump. Keith thanked outgoing president Barack Obama for his service and thanked president-elect Trump at the start of the celebration. Keith then played several of his patriotic songs, including "American Soldier", "Made in America", "Beer For My Horses", and "Courtesy of the Red, White and Blue".

On January 13, 2021, it was reported that Keith had been awarded the National Medal of Arts by President Trump. The award was given in a closed ceremony, alongside fellow country musician Ricky Skaggs.

Personal life
Keith has an honorary degree from Villanova University, which he attended from 1979 to 1980. He planned to be a petroleum engineer.

An avid University of Oklahoma sports fan, Keith is often seen at Oklahoma Sooners games and practices. He is also a fan of professional wrestling, being seen in the front row of numerous WWE shows that take place in Oklahoma, as well as performing "Courtesy of the Red, White, & Blue (The Angry American)" live at the first ever TNA Wrestling show on June 19, 2002. He is also a fan of the Pittsburgh Steelers football team. He is a Free Will Baptist.

On March 24, 1984, Keith married Tricia Lucus. He is the father of three children—two daughters, Shelley Covel Rowland (born 1980, adopted by Keith in 1984) and Krystal "Krystal Keith" LaDawn Covel Sandubrae (born September 30, 1985; signed a contract with Show Dog-Universal in 2013), and one son (Stelen Keith Covel, born 1997). He also has four grandchildren.

On March 24, 2001, Keith's father was killed in a car accident on Interstate 35. On December 25, 2007, the Covel family was awarded $2.8 million for the wrongful death of H.K. Covel. Elias and Pedro Rodriguez, operators of Rodriguez Transportes of Tulsa, and the Republic Western Insurance Co. were found liable as they failed to equip the charter bus with properly working air brakes.

In June 2022, Keith announced that he had been diagnosed with stomach cancer at the end of the prior year, having undergone chemotherapy, radiation, and surgery for the past six months. In December of 2022, in a press release, Keith said that his battle with cancer is "pretty debilitating".

Philanthropy
Keith supports Ally's House, a non-profit organization in Oklahoma designed to aid children with cancer. Of the charity, Keith said:

Keith filmed a PSA for Little Kids Rock, a national nonprofit that works to restore and revitalize music education in disadvantaged U.S. public schools.

As of 2015, Forbes estimated Keith's annual income at $53 million.

Tours
 Brooks and Dunn's Neon Circus and Wild West Show 2001
 Unleashed Tour 2002
 with Jamie O'Neal, Emerson Drive and Rascal Flatts (Select Dates)
 USO 2002–13 (11 tours, visiting 15 countries and 3 naval ships)
 Shock'N Y'all Tour 2003
 with Blake Shelton
 Big Throwdown Tour 2004
 with Lonestar and Gretchen Wilson
 with Sawyer Brown and Terri Clark
 Big Throwdown Tour II 2005
 with Jo Dee Messina
 White Trash With Money Tour 2006
 Hookin' Up and Hangin' Out Tour 2007
 with Miranda Lambert, Trace Adkins, Josh Gracin
 Big Dog Daddy Tour 2007
 Biggest and Baddest Tour 2008–09
 with Montgomery Gentry and Trailer Choir
 America's Toughest Tour 2009
 with Trace Adkins Also Julianne Hough (Few Dates)
 Toby Keith's American Ride Tour 2010
 with Trace Adkins and James Otto
 Locked and Loaded Tour 2011
 with Eric Church and JT Hodges
 Live in Overdrive Tour
 with Brantley Gilbert
 Hammer Down Tour 2013
 with Kip Moore
 Hammer Down Under Tour 2014
 With Kellie Pickler and Eli Young Band
 Shut Up and Hold On Tour 2014
 With Colt Ford and Krystal Keith
 Good Times and Pick Up Lines Tour 2015
 With Eli Young Band and Chris Janson
 Interstates and Tailgates Tour 2016
 With Eric Paslay
 Should've Been A Cowboy XXV 2018

Discography

Studio albums
 Toby Keith (1993)
 Boomtown (1994)
 Blue Moon (1996)
 Dream Walkin' (1997)
 How Do You Like Me Now?! (1999)
 Pull My Chain (2001)
 Unleashed (2002)
 Shock'n Y'all (2003)
 Honkytonk University (2005)
 White Trash with Money (2006)
 Big Dog Daddy (2007)
 That Don't Make Me a Bad Guy (2008)
 American Ride (2009)
 Bullets in the Gun (2010)
 Clancy's Tavern (2011)
 Hope on the Rocks (2012)
 Drinks After Work (2013)
 35 MPH Town (2015)
 Peso in My Pocket (2021)

Compilation albums
 Greatest Hits Volume One (1998)
 20th Century Masters: The Millennium Collection (2003)
 Greatest Hits 2 (2004)
 35 Biggest Hits (2008)
 The Bus Songs (2017)

Christmas albums
 Christmas to Christmas (1995)
 A Classic Christmas (2007)

Number one singles
 "Should've Been a Cowboy"
 "Who's That Man"
 "Me Too"
 "How Do You Like Me Now?!"
 "You Shouldn't Kiss Me Like This"
 "I'm Just Talkin' About Tonight"
 "I Wanna Talk About Me"
 "My List"
 "Courtesy of the Red, White, & Blue (The Angry American)"
 "Who's Your Daddy?"
 "Beer for My Horses" 
 "I Love This Bar"
 "American Soldier"
 "Whiskey Girl"
 "As Good as I Once Was"
 "Love Me If You Can"
 "She Never Cried in Front of Me"
 "God Love Her"
 "American Ride"
 "Made in America"

Filmography
 Broken Bridges (2006) also starring Kelly Preston and Lindsey Haun
 CMT Music Awards (2003–2012) Co-Host With Pamela Anderson and Kristen Bell
 Beer for My Horses (2008)

References

External links

 Toby Keith official website
 

1961 births
Male actors from Oklahoma
American baritones
American country singer-songwriters
American country record producers
American people of English descent
Country musicians from Oklahoma
Country pop musicians
DreamWorks Records artists
Living people
Mercury Records artists
People from Clinton, Oklahoma
People from Moore, Oklahoma
Show Dog-Universal Music artists
Villanova University people
Singer-songwriters from Oklahoma
Baptists from Oklahoma
United States National Medal of Arts recipients
American male singer-songwriters
United Service Organizations entertainers